This is a list of villages in Agder, a county of Norway.  Villages which are the administrative centers of their municipality are highlighted in blue and marked with this symbol (†) on this list. The term "villages" refers includes settlements, hamlets, and farm areas in Agder county. The list excludes cities located in Agder. For other counties see the lists of villages in Norway.

See also
For other counties, see the lists of villages in Norway

References

External links 

Agder